Herman "Hyman" Amberg (c. 1902 – November 3, 1926) was a New York mobster who, with his brothers, Joseph and Louis, formed one of the prominent criminal gangs during Prohibition.

Death 
Often acting as an enforcer, he was arrested for the murder of a local jeweler in 1926. While awaiting trial in the Tombs, he and another prisoner attempted to escape after acquiring guns on November 3, 1926. However, they made it only as far as the prison wall before being trapped by prison guards. Rather than surrender to prison authorities, Amberg and the other prisoner committed suicide. He is buried in Montefiore Cemetery.

References

External links

1900s births
1926 suicides
Year of birth uncertain
Date of birth unknown
American people who died in prison custody
Criminals from Brooklyn
Jewish American gangsters
People who committed suicide in prison custody
Prisoners who died in New York (state) detention
Suicides by firearm in New York City
20th-century American Jews